Fathers and Sons is an American sitcom television series created by Nick Arnold and Michael Zinberg, that aired on NBC from April 6 until May 4, 1986.

Premise
Merlin Olsen played a father who was also a baseball coach for his sons.

Cast
Merlin Olsen as Buddy Landau
Jason Late as Lanny Landau
Kelly Sanders as Ellen Landau
Andre Gower as Sean Flynn
Ina Fried as Matty Bolen
Nicholas Guest as Dr. Richard Bolen
Hakeem Abdul-Samad (billed mononymously as "Hakeem") as Brandon Russo

Episodes

References

External links
IMDb
TV.com
TV Guide

1986 American television series debuts
1986 American television series endings
1980s American sitcoms
English-language television shows
NBC original programming
Television series by 20th Century Fox Television
Television shows set in Los Angeles